Cour des miracles ("court of miracles") was a French term which referred to slum districts of Paris, France where the unemployed migrants from rural areas resided. They held "the usual refuge of all those wretches who came to conceal in this corner of Paris, somber, dirty, muddy, and tortuous, their pretended infirmities and their criminal pollution." The latter served as inspiration for Victor Hugos Les Misérables and The Hunchback of Notre-Dame.

Name
In pre-modern Paris a large portion of the population relied on begging for its survival. Since those with a clear handicap could expect more alms, a number of beggars faked terrible injuries and diseases. By the time they came back to their homes in the slum, they dropped their characters. A beggar who had pretended to be blind or crippled the whole day could see or walk again once back in the slum. This phenomenon gave the generic name to these areas where so many "miracles" occurred every day: courts of miracles.

Culture
Regularly the people of the Court of Miracles were thought to have organized a counter-society devoted to crime and thievery with its own hierarchy and institutions. However, this is a common theme at the time and is likely to have been little else than a literary fantasy.  For instance, the archissupots were meant to be former students in charge of teaching the local slang (argot) to the new recruits. The relationship between outlaws and the student world in the 17th century – a time of crisis – has however commonly been observed. The 17th century historian Henri Sauval claimed that the area was "a great cul-de-sac which was stinking, muddy, irregular and unpaved." He argued that the area had its own language and a subculture of crime and promiscuity: "everyone lived in great licentiousness; no one had faith or law and baptism, marriage and the sacraments were unknown."

Clearance

As crime and destitution worsened, Parisian authorities sought to reduce these areas. Gabriel Nicolas de la Reynie was tasked in 1667 with utilizing the fledgling Prefecture of Police to curb the growth of crime in the areas. By 1750, a new tactic of improving health and social care became prominent over law enforcement, and as great areas of the slums were demolished they were taken over by fishmongers and blacksmiths. The last vestiges of the old cours des miracles were eliminated with the redevelopment of the Filles-Dieu site during the French Revolution and Haussmann's renovation of Paris in the 19th century."

Contemporary culture
Cour des miracles (Greek: Η αυλή των θαυμάτων) is one of the most important contemporary Greek theater plays written by Iakovos Kambanellis and performed for first time in Athens during 1957–1958. The play projects the life stories and relationships of a group of neighbors in the working-class neighborhood of Vyronas in Athens that are facing displacement from their humble housing units surrounding a courtyard due to a new building project that the landlord initiated.

Notes

References
 

History of Paris
Districts of Paris
17th century in France